Elizabeth Hayes (née Ryan, born 23 May 1956) is an Australian reporter, journalist and television presenter.

Career 
Hayes is best known for her work as a reporter on 60 Minutes, and as a former co-host of Today. Hayes was born in Taree, New South Wales, and started her career as a cadet journalist on the local Manning River Times newspaper, becoming assistant editor. She moved to Sydney and worked for New Idea and TV Week for a few weeks, before becoming a reporter for Network Ten's Eyewitness News.

In 1981 she was signed to the Nine Network, reporting for National Nine News and then presenting the National Nine Morning News. In 1986, Hayes was appointed co-host of Today with Steve Liebmann and stayed co-host until 1996 with Tracy Grimshaw replacing her. In 1996, she joined 60 Minutes as a reporter and remains in this position today. In 2021, Hayes celebrated 40 years with the Nine Network.

Personal life
Hayes met, and married, her first husband, Brian Hayes, a builder, in her home town of Taree. Despite being divorced from Brian Hayes, she still uses his surname as her professional name. She was also briefly married to the advertising entrepreneur John Singleton in 1991, his fourth wife. In September 1998, a man who had quietly stalked her for ten years agreed not to approach her. Ben Crane, a former 60 Minutes soundman, has been her current partner since the early 2000s.

References

Australian television presenters
Australian women television presenters
Australian women journalists
1956 births
Living people
People from Taree
60 Minutes (Australian TV program) correspondents